This is a list of artists currently or formerly signed under the Avex Group  and its sub-labels in Japan and in other Asian countries. International artists that are listed here have their music distributed in Japan by Avex Group or its sub-labels.

Symbols
 []

 **

A
 AAA [Avex Trax] (official site) *Japan*
 Acid Black Cherry [Motorod] (official site) *Japan*
 After School [Avex Trax] Official Website *Japan/Taiwan/Hong Kong*
 Aiba, Hiroki [Avex Trax] (official site) *Japan*
 Aikawa, Nanase [Avex Trax] (official site) *Japan*
 Amuro, Namie [Avex Trax] (official site) *Japan*
 alan [Avex Trax] (official site) *Japan/China/Taiwan*
 A-Lin [Avex Taiwan] (official site) *Taiwan*
 Ak'Sent [Avex International] (official site) *Japan*
 Arakaki, Hitoe [Avex Trax] member of Speed *Japan*
 Arrested Development [Avex International/Cutting Edge] (official site) *Japan*
 A.T.T. [Avex Trax] (official site) *Japan*
 Aural Vampire [Avex Trax] (official site) *Japan*

B
 Back-On [Cutting Edge] (official site) *Japan*
 Ballistik Boyz from Exile Tribe (Rhythm Zone)
 Beverly 
 Big Bang [YGEX] (official site) *Japan*
 Bis (between 2012 and 2014)
 Bish
 BoA [S.M. JAPAN/Avex Trax] (official site) *Japan*
 Boredoms [Commons] (official site) *Japan*
 Breaking Benjamin [Avex International] (official site) *Japan*
 Bridear
 Bridgit Mendler [Avex International] (official site) *Japan*
 Bright [Rhythm Zone] (official site) *Japan*
 Bryk, Dan [Cutting Edge] (official site) *Japan*
 Blackpink [YGEX]

C
 Carly Rae Jepsen [Avex Taiwan]
 Cho Tokimeki Sendenbu [Avex Trax]
 Clazziquai [Avex Trax] *Japan*
 CREAM (Japanese group) [Avex Trax] (official site) *Japan* 
 Cyrus, Miley (official site)

D
 D (band) [Avex Trax] *Japan*
 D&D [Avex Trax] (official site) *Japan*
 DA PUMP [Avex Tune] (official site) *Japan*
 Day after tomorrow [Avex Trax] (official site) *Japan*
 Dead or Alive [Avex Trax] (official site) *Japan*
 Digby, Marié (official site)
 Do As Infinity [Avex Trax] (official site) *Japan*
 Dream [Avex Trax] (Dream (Japanese band))(official site) Japan*
 DJ OZMA [Avex Trax] (official site) *Japan*

E
 Every Little Thing [Avex Trax] (official site) *Japan*
 EXILE [Rhythm Zone] (official site) *Japan*
 EXO [S.M. JAPAN/Avex Group] (official site) *Japan

F
 Fairies [Sonic Groove] *Japan*
 FAKY (official site) *Japan*
 Fantastics from Exile Tribe (Rhythm Zone)
 Fantastic Plastic Machine [Cutting Edge] *Japan*
 FEMM (official site) *Japan*
 Folder 5 [Avex Tune] (official site) *Japan*
 Friedman, Marty [Avex Trax] (official site) *Japan*
 f(x) [S.M. JAPAN/Avex Trax] (official site) *Japan*

G
 Gackt [Avex Trax] (official site) *Japan*
 Gatti, Alessandra Mirka [Avex Trax] *Italy*
 Generations from Exile Tribe (Rhythm Zone)
 Genki Rockets [ Q Entertainment/Avex Trax] (official site) *Japan*
 Girls' Generation [S.M. JAPAN/Nayutawave Records/Rhythm Zone/Avex Taiwan *Taiwan*] 
 Girl Next Door [Avex Trax] (official site) *Japan*
 globe [ Universal Music Group/Avex Globe] *Japan*
 Goto, Maki [Avex Trax] (official site) *Japan*

H
 Hamasaki, Ayumi [Avex Trax] (official site) *Japan*
 Hinoi, Asuka [Sonic Groove] (official site) *Japan*
 Hinoi Team [Sonic Groove] (official site) *Japan*
 hiro [Avex Trax] member of Speed (official site) *Japan*
 hitomi [Love Life Records] (official site) *Japan*
 Hsu, Beatrice [Avex Taiwan] (Official Site) *Taiwan*
 Hsu, Vivian [Avex Taiwan] (official site) *Taiwan*
 HY [HIGASHIYAKENA SOUNDBUILDER/Avex Trax] *Japan*

I
i.n.g [Avex Taiwan] *Taiwan*
 Iconiq [Rhythm Zone] (official site) *Japan*
 Imai, Eriko [Avex Trax] member of Speed ("Elly" official site) *Japan*
 iKON [YGEX] (official site) *Japan*
 i☆Ris
 Isabel, Maria (official site)

J
 J (of LUNA SEA) [Blowgrow] (official site) *Japan*
 Janne Da Arc [Motorod] (official site) *Japan*
 J-Min [S.M. JAPAN/Avex Trax] *Japan (official site)
 Johnsson, Ana [Avex International] (official site) *Japan*
 Jonas Brothers [Avex International] (official site) *Japan*
 JUNO [Rhythm Zone/Avex Trax](official site) *Japan*
 Jurian Beat Crisis (official site) *Japan*

K
 Kajiwara, Gakuto (Avex Pictures)
 Kamiki, Aya (moved from GIZA Studio)(official site)
 kannivalism (official site)
 Katy Perry [Avex International]
 Kayō, Aiko
 Kato, Kazuki (moved to Pony Canyon and moved to Avex Trax again) (official site)
 Keiko (moved to Universal Music Group)
 Kei Nangon [Avex International]
 Kitano, Kii
 Kim Hyung Jun
 Kosaka, Riyu
 Koda, Kumi (official site)
 Komuro, Tetsuya
 Kishidan
 Kiyoharu (official site)
 Kogure, Demon [Avex Trax] (official site) *Japan*
 K ONE
 Kawamura, Ryuichi (official site)
 Kis-my-ft2 (official site) *Japan*
 Kim Ji-won Avex Entertainment
 Kolme
 Kuroyume

L
 Lia
 Lights Over Paris
 Lin, Ariel [Avex Taiwan] (official site) *Taiwan*
 Lin, Shino [Avex Taiwan] (official site) *Taiwan*
 Lindberg (official site)
 LinQ
 Lisa (official site)
 Lol (Japanese group) (official site)
 Lovato, Demi [Avex International] (official site) *Japan*
 LUNA SEA (official site)
 Lynn, Cheryl
 Lau, Andy

M
 Mai (official site)
 MAY (official site)
 May J. (official site)
 MAX (official site)
 Makihara, Noriyuki (official site)
 Matsushita, Moeko (official site)
 McFly (official site)
 McLean, A. J. [Avex International] (official site) *Japan*
 M-Flo (official site)
 mini [Cutting Edge/Avex Trax] (official site)
 mink (official site)
 Misono (official site)
 Missile Innovation (official site)
 Miura, Daichi [Avex Trax] (official site) *Japan*
 Monkey Majik (official site)
 moumoon (official site)
 M.O.V.E (official site)
 Myra (official site)

N
 Nagasawa, Nao (official site)
 Nakamura, Ataru (official site)
 'N Sync
 Nightmare (official site)
 NCT

O
 Okada, Nana (official site)
 Okumura, Hatsune (official site)
 Oblivion Dust (official site)
 Olivia (official site)
 Ono, Lisa (official site)
 O-Zone (official site)
 Osawa, Shinichi (official site)
 Otsuka, Ai (official site)

P
 Penicillin (band) [Blowgrow] (official site), as well as their independent vanity label THAT RECORDS *Japan*
 Peng, Eddie *Taiwan*
 Lucas Prata
 Prizmmy (official site)
 Prism Mates
 The Prodigy (1992-1997; Asia, under licence from XL Recordings)
 PSY [YG Japan/YGEX/Avex Trax] (official site) (official Facebook)

R
Ravex (official site)
 Red Velvet (group)
 Remioromen
 Rider Chips (official site)
 Rin' (official site)
 Rodgers, Dave (born Giancarlo Pasquini) [Avex Trax] *Italy*
 Run Girls, Run! (official site) [DIVE II entertainment]

S
 Sads (band)
 Sakamoto, Ryuichi
 Sawajiri, Erika
 Secret Number [VINE Entertainment]
 Seikima-II (official site)
 Selena Gomez [Avex International] (official site)
 S.E.S. [S.M. JAPAN/Avex Trax](disbanded)
 S.H.E
 Shimatani, Hitomi (official site)
 Shin (singer) [Avex Taiwan] (official site)
 Show Lo (official site)
 SKE48
 SHINee ([S.M. JAPAN/EMI Music Japan/Rhythm Zone])
 SM Town
 Shirota Yu [Avex Trax] (official site)
 Sifow (official site)
 Sophia (Japanese band)
 Soulhead (moved from onenation)
 Sowelu (official site)
 Speed
 Sugarcult (official site)
 Sunday [S.M. JAPAN/Avex Trax](official site) *Japan
 Super Junior [S.M. JAPAN/Rhythm Zone/Avex Trax](official site)
 SUPER☆GiRLS (official site)
 Suzuki, Ami (official site)
 SweetS (official site)
 Sweetbox (official site)
 Ferry Corsten (System F)

T
 Tang, Danson [Avex Taiwan] (official site) *Taiwan*
 TREASURE (YGEX)
 TRF (official site)
 Tackey & Tsubasa (official site)
 Tacoyaki Rainbow [Avex Trax, since 2016]
 Takano Akira
 Tamaki, Hiroshi (official site)
 Tanimura, Nana (official site)
 Tank (HIM International Music/Avex Asia)
 Tara Priya (official site) 
 Tenjochiki [S.M. JAPAN/Rhythm Zone](official site)
 Tetra-Fang
 The Boom (official site)
 The Rampage from Exile Tribe (Rhythm Zone)
 Jennifer Thomas (pianist) (official site)
 Tohoshinki [S.M. JAPAN/Rhythm Zone/Avex Trax](official site)
 Toki, Asako [Rhythm Zone] *Japan*
 TOKYO GIRLS' STYLE (official site)
 Tokyo Ska Paradise Orchestra (official site)
 tomboy (official site)
 TraxX [S.M. JAPAN/Avex Trax] (official site)
 Tse, Kay [Avex Asia] *Hong Kong*
 Tsuchiya, Anna (official site)
 The World Standard (Wa-suta) [Avex Trax] (official site)
 Takayanagi, Akane (SKE48) [Avex Entertainment]

U
Uehara, Takako [Avex Trax] member of Speed  (official site) *Japan*
U-KISS (official site)

V
 V6 (official site)
 Van, Tomiko vocalist of Do As Infinity (official site)
 Vanilla Mood
 Zhao, Vicki

W
 Wang, Cyndi [Avex Taiwan] (official site) *Taiwan*
WARPs UP
 WINNER [YGEX] (official site) *Japan*
 Wong He
 Wu Bai & China Blue
 Wagakki Band (official site) *Japan*

X
 X21
 XG [XGALX]

Y
 Yamin, Elliott (official site)
 Yazima Beauty Salon (official site)
 Yaen
 YMCK
 Yasuharu Takanashi (Fairy Tail Original Soundtrack 5)
 Yoshida, Takuro (official site)

Z
 Zelda (disbanded 1996)
 Liyin, Zhang [S.M. China/Avex Taiwan] (official site)
 ZZ (official site)
 Zebrahead

Footnotes

Avex Group
 
Lists of recording artists by label